Thomas Morrissey (born July 1956) is a former Irish politician and member of Seanad Éireann and businessman. He was nominated by the Taoiseach, Bertie Ahern to the 22nd Seanad in 2002 as a member of the now defunct Progressive Democrats. He was subsequently appointed to the Progressive Democrats Front Bench as Transportation spokesperson in September 2002. During his time as a Senator, Morrissey served on the Joint Oireachtas Committee on Transport. He also served as Chairman of the Progressive Democrats Parliamentary Party.

Morrissey was first elected as a Fine Gael representative for the Castleknock ward in the 1991 local election with 1,172 votes (15.8%). He was an unsuccessful Dáil candidate for Fine Gael in Dublin West in the 1992 general election and 1996 by-election receiving 1,179 (3.2%) and 3,728 (13.1%) votes respectively. He then joined the Progressive Democrats and was unsuccessful in the 1997 and 2002 general elections in Dublin West. He received 7.6% in 1997 and 7.9% in 2002. His second successful local election was in 1999 when he was elected as a Progressive Democrat member for Fingal County Council, again in the Castleknock ward receiving 1,218 votes (14.1%).

In 2006 he decided to run as a candidate in the 2007 general election for the Dublin North constituency. He failed to be returned having received only 1,355 votes (2.6%). His support for the privatisation of Aer Lingus may have been a factor on that occasion.  In the same year, he also failed in his candidacy for Seanad Éireann.

References

1956 births
Living people
Progressive Democrats senators
Members of the 22nd Seanad
Local councillors in Fingal
Councillors of Dublin County Council
Politicians from Fingal
Nominated members of Seanad Éireann